Bridge 9 is a historic Parker through truss bridge, carrying Shawville Road across the Missisquoi River in Sheldon, Vermont.  Built in 1928 after Vermont's devastating 1927 floods, it is one of the few surviving Parker truss bridges on the Missisquoi.  It was listed on the National Register of Historic Places in 2007.

Description and history
Bridge 9 is located just northeast of the village of Sheldon Springs, carrying Shawville Road over the Missisquoi River between that village and the rural hamlet of Shawville. It is a single-span Parker through truss structure,  in length, resting on stone and concrete abutments. The bridge deck is concrete laid on steel floor beams supported by steel stringers.

The bridge was built in 1928 to plans by the Lackawanna Steel Construction Company of Buffalo, New York, replacing an 1888 wrought iron suspension bridge. The site, just above Bancroft Falls on the river, has had a bridge of some type since the late 18th century.

See also
 
 
 
 
 National Register of Historic Places listings in Franklin County, Vermont
 List of bridges on the National Register of Historic Places in Vermont

References

Bridges on the National Register of Historic Places in Vermont
National Register of Historic Places in Franklin County, Vermont
Bridges completed in 1928
Bridges in Franklin County, Vermont
Buildings and structures in Sheldon, Vermont
Steel bridges in the United States
Parker truss bridges in the United States
Road bridges in Vermont
1928 establishments in Vermont